Marcus Eremita, Mark the Ascetic or Marcus the Ascetic was a Christian theologian, saint, and ascetic writer of the fifth century AD.

Mark is rather an ascetic than a dogmatic writer. He is content to accept dogmas from the Church; his interest is in the spiritual life as it should be led by monks. He is practical rather than mystic, belongs to the Antiochene School and shows himself to be a disciple of John Chrysostom.

Identification
Various theories about his period and works have been advanced. According to J. Kunze, Mark the Hermit was superior of a laura at Ancyra; he then as an old man left his monastery and became a hermit, probably in the desert east of Palestine, near Mar Saba. He was a contemporary of Nestorius and died after 430 but probably before the Council of Chalcedon (451). 

Nicephorus Callistus (fourteenth century) says he was a disciple of John Chrysostom ("Hist. Eccl." in Patrologia Graeca, CXLVI, XlV, 30). Cardinal Bellarmine (De Script. eccl. (1631), p. 273) thought that this Mark was the monk who prophesied ten more years of life to the Emperor Leo VI in 900. He is refuted by Tillemont.

Another view supported by the Byzantine Menaia identifies him with the Egyptian monk mentioned in Palladius, who lived in the fourth century. The discovery and identification of a work by him against Nestorius by P. Kerameus makes his period certain, as defended by Kunze.

According to a brief entry in the "Great Synaxaristes" of the Eastern Orthodox Church, his feast day is observed on 20 May.

Works
Mark's works are traditionally the following:

 Of the spiritual law, 
 Concerning those who think to be justified through works (both ascetic treatises for monks); 
 Of penitence; 
 Of baptism; 
 To Nicholas on refraining from anger and lust; 
 Disputation against a scholar (against appearing to civil courts and on celibacy); 
 Consultation of the mind with its own soul (reproaches that he makes Adam, Satan, and other men responsible for his sins instead of himself); 
 On fasting and humility; 
 On Melchisedek (against people who think that Melchisedek was an apparition of the Word of God).

All the above works are named and described in the "Myrobiblion" and are published in Gallandi's collection. To them must be added:

10. Against the Nestorians (a treatise against that heresy arranged without order).

Of these 8. is now considered spurious.

Excerpts of his writings are also included in the Philokalia.

Notes

References

Sources
Andrea Gallandi, Bibliotheca veterum Patrum, VIII (Venice, 1788), 1–104, reprinted with Gallandi's prolegomena in Patrologia Graeca, LXV, 893–1140; 
J. A. Fabricius-G. C. Harles, Bibliotheca graeca, IX (Hamburg, 1804), 267–69; 
Bernard Jungmann-Josef Fessler, Institutiones Patrologiae, II, (Innsbruck, 1892), 143–46;
Kunze, Marcus Eremita, ein neuer Zeuge fur das altkirchliche Taufbekenntnis (Leipzig, 1896).
Georges-Matthieu de Durand (1999), Marc le Moine, Traités (two volumes)

5th-century Christian theologians
5th-century Christian saints
5th-century Byzantine writers
Philokalia